Baron Johann Ludwig von Knoop (15 May 1821, in Bremen – 14 August 1894, in Bremen) was a cotton merchant and entrepreneur from the city-state Free Hanseatic City of Bremen, who became one of the richest entrepreneurs in his time. He was created a Baron by Alexander II of Russia in 1877.

Early life
He was born as son of Gerhard Knoop (1782-1862) and Anna Rebecca Frerichs (1793-1878). He had three sisters and five brothers.

Life
He studied in Bremen, and learned the cotton business at Manchester with the Bremen-born cotton exporter Johan Frerichs's company De Jersey & Co. He went to Moscow as assistant to the firm's agent Franz Holzhauer in 1840. That year he established the first power-driven cotton mill in Russia.

In 1842, the British ban on the export of cotton machinery, imposed in 1775 to protect the country's head start in technology, was lifted, allowing the manufacture of cotton to expand in Russia.  Knoop used English credit to build and fit out mills with English equipment. The commissioning in 1847 of Savva Vasilyevich Morozov's Nikolskoye mill at Orekhovo-Zuyevo, Knoop's sixth, was seen as a landmark in the industry's development in Russia.

In 1852, he founded L Knoop & Co, in association with De Jersey and the machinery manufacturer Platt Brothers of Oldham, Lancashire. In 1857, he built the largest cotton spinning mill in Europe on the island of Kreenholm at Narva, Estonia, which employed 4500 people. The Kreenholm Manufacturing Company's factory in Narva had nearly half a million spindles driven by water-power. It paid low wages, but took its responsibilities to its workforce seriously, introducing a health insurance scheme and supplying workers with dwellings, kindergartens, and schools.

Eventually, he was responsible for equipping 187 cotton mills on Russian territory. However, Knoop came under attack from the Russian Technical Society for retarding industrial development in the country. This was because he relied exclusively on English machinery and also supplied the factories with English managers, technicians, and supervisors.

Personal life
He was married to Luise Mathilde Hoyer (1824-1894). They had 3 sons and 3 daughters. Descendants of his daughter Luise Dorothea include Ernst Albrecht, Hans-Holger Albrecht  and Ursula von der Leyen.

Death
He died on 16 August 1894 at St Magnus, Bremen, where a city park created from his estate is named after him.

References 

 The Russian Technical Society and British Textile Machinery Imports, by Stuart Thompstone

19th-century businesspeople from the Russian Empire
Businesspeople from Bremen
1821 births
1894 deaths
German emigrants to the Russian Empire
Barons of the Russian Empire